Linda Ervine MBE is a language rights activist from East Belfast, Northern Ireland. She is a speaker and supporter of the Irish language and is the project leader of the "Turas" Irish language project which "aims to connect people from Protestant communities to their own history with the Irish language". Turas is operated through the East Belfast Mission of the Methodist Church in Ireland. Ervine has gained some media attention because of her coming from a Protestant Unionist background and supporting an Irish Language Act (a position generally regarded as unconventional).

Unionist Gaeilgeoir
Ervine comes from a Protestant background and herself supports Northern Ireland remaining within the United Kingdom; her family supported socialism and trade unionism when she was growing up. She is the sister-in-law of David Ervine, a former member of the loyalist paramilitary Ulster Volunteer Force and later political thinker who led the Progressive Unionist Party. Her husband Brian Ervine also led that party.

Ervine began her involvement with language issues through a six-week introduction to Gaeilge with the East Belfast Mission (a community development organisation founded in 1985) and Short Strand cross community women’s group. She then joined a beginners class at An Droichead on the Ormeau Road. From November 2011 onwards she set up her own beginners class in Newtownards Road which became the Turas Irish-Language Project.

She stresses the Protestant history of association with the Gaelic language and the Presbyterian communities of the Hebrides today (in Northern Ireland some unionists tend to associate the language exclusively with Irish republicanism).

Ervine has urged politicians from the Ulster Unionist Party and the Democratic Unionist Party (as well as the Orange Order) not to view the Gaelic language and culture as exclusively the domain of republicanism.

In December 2014, along with Alasdair Morrison; a member of the Scottish Parliament for 1999-2007, standing for the British Labour Party; she visited Stormont urging "fair treatment and respect for the Irish language." She supports the proposed Irish Language Act, saying that unionists have "nothing to fear" from the legislation and non-Irish speakers will not be impacted.

In 2020, she became the first president of the newly formed East Belfast GAA.

References

External links
Linda Ervine at Twitter

People from Belfast
Living people
Year of birth missing (living people)